Southern Pannonia may refer to:

 in geography, southern regions of the Pannonian Basin
 in ancient history, southern regions of the Roman Province of Pannonia, including:
 late Roman Province of Pannonia Savia, and
 late Roman Province of Pannonia Secunda
 in medieval history, early medieval Slavic Principality of Lower Pannonia (Pannonia inferior) and the Balaton Principality

See also
 Northern Pannonia (disambiguation)